Andinosaura stellae is a species of lizard in the family Gymnophthalmidae. It is endemic to Colombia.

References

Andinosaura
Reptiles of Colombia
Endemic fauna of Colombia
Reptiles described in 2010
Taxa named by Santiago J. Sánchez-Pacheco
Taxobox binomials not recognized by IUCN